Needing You... is a 2000 Hong Kong romantic comedy film, produced and directed by Johnnie To and Wai Ka-fai, starring Andy Lau and Sammi Cheng.

Needing You... is the first film produced by One Hundred Years of Film, a subsidiary of China Star Entertainment Group.

Plot

Kinki Kwok (Sammi Cheng) is a somewhat scatter-brained office worker at an electronics firm, who is down on her luck with love. Her boyfriend, Dan (Gabriel Harrison), cheats on her and treats her like a doormat. She is given to fits of pathological cleaning under emotional stress. Her workplace is full of gossip-mongers perpetually looking to shirk work.

Andy Lau plays Andy Cheung, her department manager. A womanizing bachelor who has to fight office politicking at the top, he comes to appreciate Kinki's work ethic and good-naturedness as something of a rarity in the company.

After Kinki helped Andy defuse a sticky work situation, Andy offers to help his subordinate in her private love life. He plots with Kinki to get back at Dan, her philandering boyfriend. In the process, the two realize they may harbor romantic feelings for each other.

Andy's old flame, Fiona (Fiona Leung) attempts to intervene, trying to hook Kinki up with young internet billionaire Roger (Raymond Wong). Although Kinki does not fancy Roger, she realizes that Andy is showing fits of unease and jealousy that is pleasing her.

Reception

Box office
During the slump in the Hong Kong film industry of the late 1990s,  Needing You... raked in HK$6.5 million during its first three days of release in Hong Kong, and amassed a total of HK$35 million in Hong Kong alone, rivaling John Woo's American film, Mission: Impossible 2, which screened during the same period in Hong Kong and triumphing all other Hong Kong films screened for the past few years. In the same year, Summer Holiday earned HK$21 million, which was ranked 2nd best-selling local film after Needing You... in Hong Kong.

Cast
 Andy Lau as Andy Cheung
 Sammi Cheng as Kinki Kwok
 Fiona Leung as Fiona Yu
 Raymond Wong as Roger Young
 Hui Shiu-hung as Ronald
 Florence Kwok as Kitty
 Lam Suet as Martin
 Henry Yu as Roger's father
 Sylvia Lai as Roger's mother
 Gabriel Harrison as Dan
 Andy Tse as Mr. Fu
 May Fu as Grace
 Englie Kwok
 Vanessa Chu as Kinki's sister
 Terence Lam

References

External links
 

2000 films
Hong Kong romantic comedy films
2000 romantic comedy films
2000s Cantonese-language films
China Star Entertainment Group films
Milkyway Image films
Films directed by Johnnie To
Films directed by Wai Ka-Fai
Films set in Hong Kong
Films shot in Hong Kong
Films with screenplays by Yau Nai-hoi
Films with screenplays by Wai Ka-fai
2000s Hong Kong films